'"Tu Amor No Es Garantía"' (English: Your Love Is Not Guaranteed) is a song performed by Dominican-American singer-songwriter Anaís. The song was the lead single from his second studio album Con Todo Mi Corazón (2007).

The song was not a big hit for Anais, and failed to reach the success of her previous singles. It was however a moderate hit and gave her 4th top 40 hit on the Billboard Hot Latin Tracks chart, peaking just inside, at 39.

Music video

The music video for the song was filmed in Old San Juan, Puerto Rico. The video starts with Anais in a dark room, backed by a live orchestra and is inter cut with various scenes of her and her assumed lover, first going on a date, then getting into an argument, and finally making up.

2007 singles
2007 songs
Anaís Martínez songs
Spanish-language songs
Univision Music Group singles
2000s ballads
Latin ballads
Pop ballads